The Jardin exotique de Ponteilla (3 hectares) is a botanical garden located on the Route de Nyls, Ponteilla, Pyrénées-Orientales, Languedoc-Roussillon, France. It is open in the warmer months; an admission fee is charged.

The garden was created in 1991 on a former vineyard, and opened to the public in 1994. Today it contains more than 1,800 varieties of plants from around the world, including cactus, bamboo, palm trees, eucalyptus, and carnivorous plants.

See also 
 List of botanical gardens in France

References 
 Official site of Jardin exotique de Ponteilla
 Conservatoire des Jardins et Paysages entry (French)
 Réseau Culturel entry (French)
 Je Decouvre La France entry (French)
 Petit Futé entry (French)
 Jardinez entry (French)
 Wikimapia entry

Ponteilla, Jardin exotique de
Ponteilla, Jardin exotique de